Bara River is a river in Khyber Agency and Khyber Pakhtunkhwa, Pakistan. The Bara River originates in the Tirah Valley of Bara Tehsil, Khyber Agency. It joins the Kabul River Canal which originates from the Warsak Dam, and re-enters Peshawar. Then it flows in the North-easterly direction to the Nowshera District, eventually joining the Kabul River near Camp Koruna, Akbarpura. Due to its higher elevation, very limited areas flow through gravity into Bara river.

See also 
 Bara, Pakistan
 Bara tehsil
 

Rivers of Khyber Pakhtunkhwa
Kabul River
Khyber District
Rivers of Pakistan